Darren Hall may refer to:

Darren Hall (baseball) (born 1964), Major League Baseball pitcher
Darren Hall (badminton) (born 1965), retired badminton player from Great Britain
Darren Hall (American football) (born 2000), National Football League player